Rajan Krishnan was a leading contemporary Indian artist who lived and worked in Kerala.

He hailed from Pallikkal, a small village  near Cheruthuruthy in Thrissur district of Kerala.  Born as the sixth of the seven offspring of Mandalaparambil Krishnan and Narayani,  Rajan had his early education at the Government High School, Cheruthuruthy.  Though he joined for BA Economics at NSS College, Ottapalam, he soon realised that his passion lay in pursuing the visual arts.  Abandoning the Economics Course in 1989, without writing the University examinations,  he joined the College of Fine Arts, Thiruvananthapuram in 1990.  After completing Bachelor in Fine Arts (BFA) from College of Fine Arts, Thiruvananthapuram in 1994, he joined the M.S. University, Baroda for Master in Fine Arts (MFA). In 1996, after completing MFA, Rajan returned to his home State, opting to work from there instead of migrating to large metros of India like many of his contemporaries were doing at that time.

Three years he lived in Thiruvananthapuram, working for a year as the Guest Lecturer at his alma mater, the  College of Fine Arts Trivandrum. In 2000, he moved to Kochi  and participating in many group shows by this time. He was also instrumental in organising many exhibitions and art-related events in Kochi during this period.  In 2004,  his first solo show was held at Kashi Art Gallery, a unique art space run by the late Anoop Skaria and his wife Dorrie Younger in Fort Kochi.

'En route,' his solo show presented by Bombay Art Gallery of Aditya Ruia, in Mumbai made Rajan an important figure in the national art scene of India.  Soon afterwards, he started working with Bodhi Art, who presented his works at Art Singapore in 2006. Next year was held his first international solo, 'Memoir' at Bodhi Art, New York.  It was followed by 'Ore / Substances of Earth - I,' a major show in which he presented a huge terracotta installation titled 'ORE' which was made up of a 10-foot tall assemblage of terracotta figurines made by a large number of people as part of a community art project. It was accompanied by paintings as well as a metal installation titled 'Wing,' and a video installation, 'Making of Ore.'

In 2008, he presented a portion of the terracotta figurines in another solo show, 'RE-VISIT' held at OED Basement, by Gallery OED  in Ernakulam.  'Four Paintings,' another solo was held at Bombay Art Gallery in Mumbai in 2009. His last solo show was 'Ancestry,' held at Aicon Gallery, New York in 2011.

He died on February 11, 2016.

Solo shows
2004 – Little Black Drawings, Kashi Art Gallery, Kochi.
2006 – En route, Bombay Art Gallery, Mumbai.
2006 – Art Singapore 2006, Bodhi Art, Singapore.
2007 – Memoir, Bodhi Art, New York.
2008 – Ore / Substances of Earth-I, Bodhi Space, Mumbai.
2008 – RE-VISIT, OED Basement, Kochi.                                       
2009 – Four Paintings, Bombay Art Gallery, Mumbai.
2011 – Ancestry, Aicon Gallery, New York

Art fairs
2006 – Art Singapore, Bodhi Art, Singapore.
2007 – Gulf Art Fair, Dubai, Bodhi Art.
2008 – Art Cologne, Italy, Bodhi Art.
2008 – Art Chicago, Bodhi Art.
2008 – Hong Kong Art Fair, Bombay Art Gallery, Mumbai.
2011 – India Art Summit, Gallery OED, Kochi.
2011 – Art Dubai. Aicon Gallery, London.
2011 – Art Chennai, Gallery OED, Kochi.
2012 –  India Art Fair, Gallery OED, Kochi.
2012 – Art Chennai, Gallery OED, Kochi.
2012 – Art Dubai. Aicon Gallery, New York.
2012 – Art Hamptons, Aicon Gallery, New York.
2013–  India Art Fair, Gallery OED, Kochi 
2013 – Art Dubai. Aicon Gallery, New York.
2014 – BRAFA, J.Bastien Art, Brussels, Belgium.
2014 – Art Stage Singapore, Aicon Gallery, New York. 
2014 – India Art Fair, Aicon Gallery, New York.
2014 – Busan Art Fair,Gallery1000A, Korea
2015 –  India Art Fair, Gallery Ragini, Delhi. 
2015 – Vadfest, Faculty of Fine Arts, Baroda.

Curated shows
2009 – Let It Happen, OED, Kochi,.-Artists: N N Rimzon, Reghunadhan K,& Rajan Krishnan.
2010 – Earth,Gallery OED, Kochi and Indigo & Labernum Galleries,Chennai.- Artists: Gulam Mohammed Sheikh, Sudhir Patwardhan, N N Rimzon, Rajan Krishnan & Sujith S N.

Participated shows
1997 – Gift for India, SAHMAT, Ravindra Bhavan, New Delhi.
1998 – Miniature Format Show, Gallery Sans Tache, Mumbai.
1998 – Substances on Black Moon, Galleria Mareechika, Kochi. 
1999 – An Album of Drawings and Paintings, Draavidia Gallery, Kochi. 
2000 – Chingamela, Kerala Kalapeetom, Kochi. 
2001 – Annual show, Kerala Lalithakala Akademi, Durbar Hall Art Centre, Kochi. 
2002 – Cross Currents, Daira Centre for Art & Culture, Hyderabad.
2002 – An Album of Drawings, Draavidia, Kochi.  
2002 – Tree Festival, Kashi Art Cafe, Fort Kochi. 
2002 – Monsoon Show, Daira Centre for Art & Culture, Hyderabad. 
2003 – Regional Art Exhibition, Lalit Kala Akademi Regional Centre, Chennai
2003 – Remembering Bhupen, Kashi Art Café, Fort Kochi. 
2004 – Group show, Gallery Beyond, Mumbai. 
2005 – New Colours of Sumukha, Gallery Sumukha, Bangalore.
2005 – Double Enders, curated by Bose Krishnamachari, at Jehangir Art Gallery & Museum Gallery, Mumbai, Vadehra Art Gallery, New Delhi, Gallery Sumukha, Bangalore, and Durbar Hall Art Centre, Kochi.
2006 – Group show of Indian artists, Visual Arts Gallery, Hong Kong, presented by Gallery Sumukha.
2006 – Group show, Shrishti Art Gallery, Hyderabad.
2006 – Four by Four, Kashi Art Gallery, Kochi.
2006 – Group show, Open Eyed Dreams, Durbar Hall Art Centre, Kochi.
2006 – Summer Rites, Gallery Beyond, Mumbai.
2006 – Real, mattersofart, New Delhi.
2006 – Take Two - The Chennai Chapter' Group Show, Gallery Sumukha.
2006 – A Compensation for what has been lost, curated by Johny M L, Travancore Art Gallery, New Delhi.
2007 – Gulf Art Fair, Dubai, Bodhi Art.
2007 – Representation, Triva Contemporary, Thiruvananthapuram. 
2007 – Kashi – 10 Light Years, Kashi Art Gallery, Kochi. 
2007 – India-Maximum City, Galerie Helene Lamarque, Paris.
2008 – Art Cologne, Italy, Bodhi Art.
2008 – Art Chicago, Bodhi Art.
2008 – Hong Kong International Art Fair, Bombay Art Gallery.
2008 – Art Beat, The Shrine Gallery, New Delhi.
2008 – Triva 2008, Annual Show, Triva Contemporary, Thiruvananthapuram. 
2008 – Keep Drawing, Gallery Espace, New Delhi. 
2008 – The Drawing Show, Gallery Beyond, Mumbai. 
2008 – Video Wednesday, Gallery Espace, New Delhi. 
2008 – Works by Various Artists, Bodhi Art, New York. 
2008 – The Hot Shots, The Viewing Room, Mumbai. 
2009 – Metamorphosis – Change and Continuity in Indian Contemporary Art, Phyllis Weston Annie Bolling Gallery, Cincinnati, USA.
2009 – Facets of A People, curated by Oindrila Maity, Gallery OED, Kochi.  
2009 – Group Show, Triva Contemporary, Thiruvananthapuram.
2009 – Group Show, Gallery Beyond, Mumbai. 
2009 – Group Show, Gallery Kolkata, Kolkata.
2009 – Group Show, Threshold Art Gallery, New Delhi.
2009 – RE-CLAIM / RE-CITE / RE-CYCLE, Latitude 28, New Delhi & Bose Pacia, Kolkata, curated by Bhavana Kakar.
2009 – Evidentia, Gallery Sumukha, Bangalore. 
2009 – Vicissitudes of the Constructed Images, curated by Suruchi Khubchandani, Tangerine Art Space, Bangalore.
2010 – The Empire Strikes Back : Indian Art Today, Saatchi Gallery, London.
2010 – Nature Revisited, curated by Jayashree Chakravarty and Anirudh Chari, Gallery Sanskriti, Kolkata. 
2010 – Creating  CommonWealth, Gallery Ragini, Delhi.
2010 – Who has seen Gandhi,  Tangerine Art Space, Bangalore.
2010 – Alt+Refresh, Pigment Art, Delhi.
2010 – Earth, Gallery OED, Kochi.
2010 – Earth, Gallery OED at Indigo and Labernum Galleries, Chennai.
2010 – The Silk Road,  works by Chinese, Indian, Iranian, Palestinian, Lebanese, Egyptian, Afghan and Pakistani artists, Saatchi Gallery in Lille (Lille 3000), France.
2011 – At Walden Pond, Gallery Beyond, Mumbai.
2011 – Space-Untitled, David Hall, Kochi.
2011 – Turn of the Tide, Tangerine Art space, Bangalore.
2011 – The Big Picture, curated by Abhishek Poddar for IFA,Gallery Sumukha, Bangalore.
2011 – Masterpieces of Indian Art, Aicon Gallery, North Carolina.
2011 – Reprise, Aicon Gallery New York.
2011 – Adbhutam, Rasa in Indian Art, CIMA Gallery, Kolkata.
2011 – Palimpses, Gallery Beyond, Mumbai.
2011 – Lateral Insertions, Gallery Bluespade, Bangalore. 
2011 – Video Wednesday II, curated by Gayatri Sinha, Gallery Espace, Delhi
2012 – Adbhutam, Rasa in Indian Art, CIMA Gallery at Visual Arts Gallery, India Habitat Centre, New Delhi.
2012 – Art for Humanity, curated by Pranali Daundker, in aid of citizens for justice and peace, Mumbai. 
2012 – 1341 AD, Gallery OED, Kochi.
2012 – Big is Small, miniature art show, curated by Anoop Kamath, Durbar Hall Art Centre, Kochi.
2012 – Concrescence, Gallery Beyond, Mumbai.
2012 – Between Darkness & Magic, CIMA Gallery Kolkata. 
2012 – The Embebd Landscape, Religare Art Galley, Delhi.
2013 – Between Darkness & Magic, CIMA Gallery at Visual Arts Gallery, India Habitat Centre, New Delhi.
2013 – Card-O-Logy, Curated by Jasmine Shah Varma, Samsara Art, Mumbai.
2013 – Up to the Nines, Gallery Beyond, Mumbai. 
2013 – Remaking the Modern, London Summer Exhibition, Aicon Gallery, New York.
2013 – Quad, curated by Niten Mehta,Visual Arts Gallery, India Habitat Centre, New Delhi.
2013 – It Matters, Seher, India International  Centre, New Delhi.
2013 – Revisit, at the Lalitha Kala Akademy, Thrissur by Gallery OED, Kochi.
2013 – In the Colours of India, J.Bastien Art, Brussels, Belgium.
2013 – Arrival & Dipartures : The Story of Indian Modern Art, San Francisco, by Aicon Gallery, New York.
2014 – The Contemporary Walk III, Gallery Ragini, New Delhi.
2015 – Reviving the Retinal, Gallery OED, Kochi. 
2015 – OED Show 2015, Gallery OED, Kochi.

References

External links
 https://www.deshabhimani.com/photo-gallery/rajan-m-krishnan/25
 https://galleryragini.com/rajan-krishnan/
 http://www.aicongallery.com/exhibitions/rajan-krishnan-a-retrospective/artist-bios
 https://www.mutualart.com/Artist/Rajan-M--Krishnan/39EA5FA2108AEE77
 https://takeonartmagazine.com/tribute/realism-as-a-metaphor-retrospective-of-rajan-krishnan/
 https://www.deccanchronicle.com/lifestyle/books-and-art/100118/language-of-landscapes.html
 http://www.keralaculture.org/twenty-first-century/493
 https://chatterjeeandlal.com/shows/delicate-bond-of-steel/
 https://mumbaimirror.indiatimes.com/entertainment/art-theatre/absurdly-great/articleshow/15932210.cms
 https://www.youtube.com/watch?v=AF1b6AjOyzc
 http://johnyml.blogspot.com/2016/02/one-more-artist-departs-life-and-times.html
 https://www.youtube.com/watch?v=mfx_Re8o9Ds
 https://www.saffronart.com/artists/rajan-krishnan
 https://www.saatchigallery.com/artist/rajan_krishnan
 https://www.artandobject.com/press-release/aicon-gallery-honors-late-rajan-krishnan-retrospective
 http://johnyml.blogspot.com/2016/02/one-more-artist-departs-life-and-times.html
 https://www.thehindu.com/features/friday-review/art/the-art-route/article2054106.ece

1967 births
Painters from Kerala
People from Thrissur district
2016 deaths
20th-century Indian painters